Bipim, or Warkay-Bipim, is a Papuan language spoken in Indonesian province of Papua.

References

Marind–Yaqai languages
Languages of Western Province (Papua New Guinea)